Zlakusa is a village located in the municipality of Užice, western Serbia. As of 2011 census, the village had a population of 671 inhabitants.

References

Užice
Populated places in Zlatibor District